The women's doubles Tournament at the 2006 İstanbul Cup took place between 22 May and 27 May on outdoor clay courts in Istanbul, Turkey. Alona Bondarenko and Anastasiya Yakimova won the title, defeating Sania Mirza and Alicia Molik in the final.

Seeds

  Anna-Lena Grönefeld /  Meghann Shaughnessy (first round, withdrew due to Shaughnessy's right ankle sprain)
  Maria Elena Camerin /  Emmanuelle Gagliardi (first round)
  Eleni Daniilidou /  Jasmin Wöhr (quarterfinals)
  Ashley Harkleroad /  Bethanie Mattek (quarterfinals)

Draw

Qualification draw

References

Main Draw

Istanbul Cup - Doubles
İstanbul Cup